Edward Grosvenor  was an English soldier and politician who sat in the House of Commons from 1656 to 1659. He served in the Parliamentary army in the English Civil War.

Grosvenor was quartermaster-general in the Parliamentary army. He was created MA at Oxford University on 19 May 1649. In 1656, he was elected Member of Parliament for Middlesex in the Second Protectorate Parliament. He was re-elected MP for Middlesex in 1659 for the Third Protectorate Parliament.

References

Year of birth missing
Year of death missing
Roundheads
Alumni of the University of Oxford
Members of the Parliament of England for Middlesex
English MPs 1656–1658
English MPs 1659